Magnetic Island is a small island on the north side of Tuxedni Bay, an inlet on the lower west side of Cook Inlet in south-central Alaska. The island is surrounded by mudflats that are under water during high tides. The island got its name from the presence of magnetism (believed due to magnetite) identified during a geological survey in 1951.

The island has archaeological significance, which includes a prehistoric human habitation site which has been dated to c. 1800–1400 BCE. The site consists of a series of depressions that were excavated in 2012, yielding several layers of cultural materials, including fire-cracked stones and hearths, and stone tools stylistically associated with the Arctic Small Tool tradition. The site was presumed to be abandoned due to volcanic activity.

The archaeological site was listed on the National Register of Historic Places in 2015.

See also
List of islands of Alaska
National Register of Historic Places listings in Kenai Peninsula Borough, Alaska

References

Islands of Alaska
Islands of Kenai Peninsula Borough, Alaska
Archaeological sites on the National Register of Historic Places in Alaska
National Register of Historic Places in Kenai Peninsula Borough, Alaska